Jakub Sangowski (born 11 March 2002) is a Polish professional footballer who plays as a striker for I liga side Skra Częstochowa, on loan from Warta Poznań.

References

External links

2002 births
Living people
Polish footballers
Warta Poznań players
Lech Poznań players
Zagłębie Lubin players
Lechia Gdańsk players
Zagłębie Sosnowiec players
Cagliari Calcio players
Skra Częstochowa players
Association football forwards
Ekstraklasa players
I liga players
Footballers from Poznań